The Ventura County Sheriff's Office (VCSO), also sometimes known as the Ventura County Sheriff's Department (VCSD), provides law enforcement for the unincorporated areas of Ventura County, California as well as several cities within the county.  The cities that Ventura County Sheriff's Office provides police services for are Camarillo, Fillmore, Moorpark, Ojai, and Thousand Oaks.

Mission
The mission of the VCSO is stated by it to be: "We, the members of the Ventura County Sheriff's Office, are committed to safeguard the lives and property of the residents of Ventura County and respond to public concerns in a manner which promotes neighborhoods free from the fear of crime."

History
The Office of the Sheriff for Ventura County began in February 1873, with the election of Sheriff Frank Peterson. What began as a duty to collect taxes and catch horse thieves has evolved significantly as the county has changed and grown. Seventeen other Sheriffs have held the Office of the Sheriff since 1873. The administration of justice (and more criminals going to trial rather than the dispensing of "frontier justice") became more sophisticated during the late 19th century. Sheriff Edmund Guy McMartin, a popular and upright man who was elected Sheriff five times, was the first and only Sheriff killed in the line of duty while apprehending a murder suspect in 1921.

Public hangings and bootlegging arrests gave way to police practices and procedures commonly recognized today. The modern era of Ventura County law enforcement began in 1959 with Sheriff William Hill. The 1970s saw the genesis of community involvement programs like Community Orientated Policing and Problem Solving (COPPS), DARE and Neighborhood Watch. Today, the cornerstone of county policing is the partnership between the Sheriff's Office and county residents.

1920s
Sheriff Edmund Guy McMartin died on August 20, 1921 when he and Oxnard Township Constable W.E. Kelley were killed in the line of duty while attempting to arrest a murder suspect. Among his many accomplishments, McMartin was known for bringing the first automobile, a 1906 Urea, to law enforcement usage in Ventura County.

1950s
Deputy Donald Gregory was killed instantly on September 9, 1951 when the patrol car his partner was driving hit a telephone pole. An unidentified wrong way driver caused the collision on Highway 118 near Simi Valley. Donald was a veteran of the Korean War. He started with the Sheriff's Department in May 1949, and served the community of Thousand Oaks.

1960s
Reserve (Auxiliary) Deputy Bryce Patten was shot and killed on August 19, 1960 while working a roadblock on Casitas Pass Road. The suspects in a $150 liquor store robbery shot Patten to avoid being caught. The three suspects were caught in Bakersfield six days later and prosecuted. Bryce graduated summa cum laude from the University of California, Santa Barbara, and was a full-time history teacher at Ventura High School. His students described him as a teacher with whom they liked to work.  He donated many hours to improve his patrol skills, and served the children in the community as a Boy Scout Troop Leader.  Bryce was survived by his wife, Diane, and their children, Charles, and Lucinda.

Deputy Earl Mendenhall died on June 15, 1961 from injuries received in a traffic collision when the mentally ill prisoner Mendenhall was transporting grabbed the steering wheel and directed the car into oncoming traffic. Earl served as a policeman for the City of Ventura prior to working for the Ventura County Sheriff's Office. He served in World War II with the U.S. Marine Corps.

Deputy Chester "Chico" Larson drowned on January 20, 1969 while attempting to rescue a group of hikers at Sespe Creek. Chico was stranded in a stalled rescue tractor in the middle of the river and was washed off the top of the tractor with 10 other victims. There was one survivor. Two days, earlier, Chico saved a party of 12 school girls and 2 adults. He was stationed at Lockwood Valley.

1970s
Detective Donald E. Haynie was shot and killed June 5, 1970 while attempting to make a narcotics arrest in Fillmore. Haynie and three other plainclothes sheriff's narcotics agents entered the house of a suspected drug dealer. The suspect's 78-year-old father shot Haynie once in the chest. The shooting was determined to be a misunderstanding, and the father was released. Donald served as a military policeman in the Army. He also enjoyed hunting with fellow officers and spending time with his family.
 
In October 1973, Lieutenant Harvey A. "Hank" Varat, a 14-year law enforcement veteran, was on a search and rescue training exercise in the Santa Susanna Mountains when he was bit by a tick and infected with Rocky Mountain spotted fever. He died four days later on October 20, 1973 from the fever. Varat helped develop the SWAT team, Deep-Sea Diving Team, and the search and rescue team. He is best remembered by his co-workers as his picture portrays, an organizer and an outdoors man contracted during a Search and Rescue exercise.

Sergeant Tom Collins died on October 25, 1975 when the helicopter he was flying crashed into the Santa Clara riverbed. Tom started the helicopter unit for the Ventura County Sheriff's Office in 1971. Prior to working for the department, he flew helicopters for the Navy. As a Naval Lieutenant, Tom was the youngest commissioned officer at that time.

1990s
Deputy Peter Aguirre was shot and killed on July 17, 1996 while responding to a domestic call in the City of Ojai. The suspect was also shot, but survived and was prosecuted. Peter started as a cadet with the VCSO and served as a Deputy for over two years. Peter was reportedly admired by fellow deputies for his compassion and ability to deal with people. Sheriff Carpenter described Peter as a "terrific officer with a bright future."

Senior Deputy Lisa Whitney was killed on August 12, 1998 in a traffic accident when a driver failed to stop at an inoperative traffic light in Ventura. Lisa was Officer of the Year in 1996. Her strong work ethic gained her the position of investigator with the Major Crimes Unit after serving only eight years as an officer. Whitney was a member of the Mounted Patrol Unit, the Mounted Honor Guard, and a certified trainer throughout California. Whitney is remembered as the "Angel on horseback."

2000s
Deputy Robert D. Bornet, a 10-year veteran of the Ventura County Sheriff's Office, was killed on November 6, 2006 in a traffic accident while attempting to stop a motorist for a vehicle code violation. Bornet was in uniform and driving in his personal vehicle when the accident occurred. Bornet also served 19 years in the United States Navy earning the rate of master chief petty officer. Robert is survived by his wife Vicki; and their four children, Katie, Leslie, Daniel, and Christopher.

2010s 

Deputy Eugene Kostiuchenko, an 11-year veteran, was killed on October 28, 2014 while concluding a traffic stop on the 101 freeway at the Lewis Road off-ramp, in the Californian city of Camarillo. At approximately 1:15 am, Deputy Kostiuchenko was returning to his marked patrol vehicle when a second vehicle, driven by 25-year-old Kevin Hogrefe, struck the deputy, causing fatal injuries. Kevin Hogrefe, an alleged drunk driver, left the scene of the accident and was captured by additional deputies approximately 2 miles away at the Las Posas Road off ramp, after Hogrefe collided with a second vehicle, disabling his own.

Sergeant Ron Helus, a 29-year veteran of the VC Sheriff's Office, died on November 7, 2018 after he was shot while being the first law enforcement officer to engage an active shooter at the Borderline Bar & Grill in Thousand Oaks on the night of November 7, 2018 at approximately 11:25 pm. 11 other people were killed by the shooter.

Search and Rescue Team Member Jeffrey "Jef" Dye died on February 2, 2019, when he was struck by a vehicle on the center median of the I-5 Freeway near Gorman. Jef Dye was actively trying to rescue victims from a previous unrelated car accident when he was struck. Jef Dye is the first Ventura County Search and Rescue Team Member to have been killed in the line of duty.

Organization
The sheriff is elected in the county general elections, and he subsequently appoints his three Assistant Sheriffs.  The Assistant Sheriffs manage specific "services," or divisions, within the department.

One Assistant Sheriff manages Operations and is responsible for the patrol deputies, and has four commanders.  They also are responsible for Special Services, a varied division that includes the Air Unit, Major Crimes, Narcotics, Intelligence, Bomb Unit, SWAT, Hostage Negotiations, Forensic Sciences Laboratory, Information Systems, and Evidence Unit.  There are two commanders assigned to head these units.
One Assistant Sheriff They also manage Support Services which includes records, human resources, internal affairs, and training academy units.  There are two commanders subordinate to the Chief Deputy of Support Services.
One Assistant Sheriff manages the Detention Services oversees the jails and courts within the county, and has three supervising commanders.

Equipment

FIREARMS

The standard issued handgun was the SIG Sauer P226 .40 S&W. In 2020 it is being phased out for the SIG Sauer P320 9mm with the XCarry grip and a SIG Sauer red dot optic installed. Ammunition Speer Gold Dot 9mm 147gr JHP.

VEHICLES

As of September 2020 the Ventura County Sheriffs Department uses the Chevrolet Tahoe PPV as their primary patrol vehicle.

AIRCRAFT

The Ventura County Sheriff’s Aviation Unit began in 1971. In 2009, the Ventura County Fire District entered into a cooperative agreement in which the Aviation Unit became a joint venture between the Fire District and Sheriff’s Office. The Fire District contributes funding and staff to the operation. The unit has grown from one Bell 47 to the current fleet of four Bell UH-1 helicopters, three Sikorsky UH-60 Blackhawk helicopters (soon two to be converted to the Firehawk helicopter), and one Bell Long Ranger. This unit is the only public safety aviation unit in the county and provides support for all local and state law enforcement and fire service agencies in the county. The missions vary between law enforcement, search and rescue (SAR), emergency medical services (EMS) and fire suppression missions.

Ranks
The Ventura County Sheriff's Office's rank structure is as follows:

Senior Deputy insignia is 2 chevrons the same color as Sergeants

In popular culture
George Anson Phillips, a character in Raymond Chandler's The High Window. Phillips was an inept former deputy turned private investigator, vaguely remembered by the protagonist Marlowe.
In the 1974 film Chinatown, Roy Jenson plays Claude Mulvihill, a hired tough guy and former Ventura County Sheriff who had been on the take from rum runners during Prohibition.
The 2005 film Hostage portrays the Ventura County Sheriff's Office's SWAT team taking over a hostage situation from the fictional Bristo Camino Police Department.
The second season of HBO's True Detective sees Rachel McAdams portray Detective Ani Bezzerides, who works for the Ventura County Sheriff's CID.

See also

 List of law enforcement agencies in California

References

External links

Ventura County Sheriff's Office at the Officer Down Memorial Page

Sheriffs' departments of California
Government of Ventura County, California
Organizations based in Ventura County, California
1873 establishments in California